Radio Reșița is a Romanian regional public radio station from Reșița.

References

Reșița
Radio stations in Romania
Reșița